Pilawa is a town in Masovian Voivodeship, east-central Poland.

Pilawa may also refer to:
Piława, Lower Silesian Voivodeship (south-west Poland)
Pilawa, Piaseczno County in Masovian Voivodeship (east-central Poland)
Piława, Szczecinek County in West Pomeranian Voivodeship (north-west Poland)
Piława, Wałcz County in West Pomeranian Voivodeship (north-west Poland)
Piława, a river in Lower Silesia (south-west Poland)
Piława, a river near Piła in western Poland
Piława, Polish name of the Russian seaport Baltiysk (German name: Pillau)
Jörg Pilawa (born 1965), German television presenter

See also
Coat of arms of Piława
Piława Górna, a town on the Piława in Lower Silesia
Piława Dolna, a village on the Piława in Lower Silesia